Paramveer Singh (born 22 November 1987) is an Indian former cricketer. He played two first-class matches for Hyderabad between 2010 and 2012.

See also
 List of Hyderabad cricketers

References

External links
 

1987 births
Living people
Indian cricketers
Hyderabad cricketers
Cricketers from Hyderabad, India